ISHR can stand for:

 International Service for Human Rights
 International Society for Heart Research
 International Society for the History of Rhetoric
 International Society for Human Rights
 International School Hannover Region